Esparto (Spanish for "Halfah grass") is a census-designated place (CDP) in Yolo County, California, United States. It is part of the Sacramento–Arden-Arcade–Roseville Metropolitan Statistical Area. The population was 3,108 at the 2010 census.

History

Vaca Valley Railroad officials gave the name Esperanza ("hope" in Spanish) to their new townsite in 1888, but when the post office was established in 1890 the name had to be changed because there was already an Esperanza in Tulare County. The name Esparto was chosen as the new name, and it means "feather grass" (Stipa tenacissima) in Spanish. In 1888 Esparto was laid with track from the Vaca Valley Railroad (later consolidated into the Southern Pacific Railroad) that trailed to Rumsey. In 1893, Yolo County's second high school was established in the town of Esparto, Esparto High School, but a building for it was not built until 1918.

The Vaca Valley Railroad began in 1937 to remove track from Rumsey to Esparto, stopping train service northwest of Esparto in 1941. The passenger service from Esparto to Elmira was officially discontinued in 1957. Voters approved the formation of a school district in 1959-60 that encompass the Capay Valley. Another major win for the community was the successful fundraising for the Esparto Regional Library Branch of the Yolo County Library in 1999.

A local quarry was used in 2009 by the MythBusters to test the "Knock Your Socks off" myth. A large ANFO explosion was detonated which caused damage and much local complaint as described in the episode "Location, Location, Location". According to Grant Imahara, who was part of the team performing the test, the MythBusters have been unable to set foot into Esparto following the incident.

Schools
Esparto currently has 4 schools, Esparto Elementary School, Esparto Middle School, Esparto High School, and Madison High School.

Geography

Demographics

At the 2010 census Esparto had a population of 3,108, a significant increase from its 2010 census population of 1,858. The racial makeup of Esparto was 1,855 (59.7%) White, 45 (1.4%) African American, 50 (1.6%) Native American, 129 (4.2%) Asian, 6 (0.2%) Pacific Islander, 904 (29.1%) from other races, and 119 (3.8%) from two or more races. Hispanic or Latino of any race were 1,538 persons (49.5%).

The whole population lived in households, no one lived in non-institutionalized group quarters and no one was institutionalized.

There were 974 households, 421 (43.2%) had children under the age of 18 living in them, 560 (57.5%) were opposite-sex married couples living together, 121 (12.4%) had a female householder with no husband present, 66 (6.8%) had a male householder with no wife present.  There were 62 (6.4%) unmarried opposite-sex partnerships, and 4 (0.4%) same-sex married couples or partnerships. 172 households (17.7%) were one person and 76 (7.8%) had someone living alone who was 65 or older. The average household size was 3.19.  There were 747 families (76.7% of households); the average family size was 3.63.

The age distribution was 888 people (28.6%) under the age of 18, 322 people (10.4%) aged 18 to 24, 817 people (26.3%) aged 25 to 44, 763 people (24.5%) aged 45 to 64, and 318 people (10.2%) who were 65 or older.  The median age was 33.1 years. For every 100 females, there were 100.5 males.  For every 100 females age 18 and over, there were 102.2 males.

There were 1,055 housing units at an average density of 229.3 per square mile, of the occupied units 689 (70.7%) were owner-occupied and 285 (29.3%) were rented. The homeowner vacancy rate was 2.3%; the rental vacancy rate was 5.0%.  2,149 people (69.1% of the population) lived in owner-occupied housing units and 959 people (30.9%) lived in rental housing units.

References

Census-designated places in Yolo County, California
Census-designated places in California